WWE Superstars, or simply Superstars, is an American professional wrestling television program that was produced by WWE that originally aired on WGN America in the United States and later broadcast on the WWE Network. After the final domestic television broadcast, the show moved to an Internet broadcast format while maintaining a traditional television broadcast in international markets. The show featured mid-to-low card WWE Superstars in a format similar to the former shows Heat and Velocity which served the same purpose. "Enhancement talent" bouts also happened often. Big names such as John Cena, Randy Orton, The Undertaker, and Triple H appeared on the show at its beginning.

Until early 2010, the replay also aired on WGN-TV. However, it was removed, hence eliminating distribution of the show from the Canadian fanbase.

Online reports stated that the network did not renew the series because it didn't live up to its expectations. The show continued to be produced for international broadcasting until .

On November 28, 2016, it was announced that Superstars had been canceled by WWE and would be replaced on the WWE Network by 205 Live. WWE Main Event would serve as the complementary show featuring Raw and SmackDown talents (and would later replace WWE Superstars for international markets).

Select episodes are viewable on the WWE Network, and episodes from September 17, 2009, until September 20, 2012, are available to watch on WWE's official YouTube channel.

Production 
The last theme song for WWE Superstars was "New Day Coming" by CFO$ featuring Todd Clark, which replaced "Invincible" by Adelitas Way on May 17, 2013. The final commentators were Tom Phillips and Corey Graves, and JoJo was the last ring announcer.

Matches featured on Superstars were taped earlier in the week, during the Raw events on Monday nights. The program aired on Thursdays until January 2015 when SmackDown moved to same night. Superstars  was then moved to Fridays on WWE Network, with its first Friday night airing on January 16.

Commentators

Ring announcers

International broadcasters
In addition to being broadcast in the United States on WWE Network, WWE Superstars was also broadcast internationally.

See also

List of former WWE television programming

References

External links

2009 in professional wrestling
2009 American television series debuts
2011 web series debuts
2016 American television series endings
Superstars
WGN America original programming
WWE webcasts
English-language television shows
American non-fiction web series
Superstars
Hulu original programming